Somebody's Hero may refer to:

 "Somebody's Hero" (song), a 2004 song by Jamie O'Neal
 Somebody's Hero (film), a 2012 American family feature film